The 2008 Libertarian Party presidential primaries allowed voters to indicate non-binding preferences for the Libertarian Party's presidential candidate. These differed from the Republican or Democratic presidential primaries and caucuses in that they did not appoint delegates to represent a candidate at the party's convention to select the party's nominee for the United States presidential election. The party's nominee for the 2008 presidential election was chosen directly by registered delegates at the 2008 Libertarian National Convention, which ran from May 22 to 26, 2008.  The delegates nominated former congressman Bob Barr (who did not run in the primaries) for president and media personality Wayne Allyn Root for vice president.

Two primaries were held, one in Missouri and one in California. A total of 18,915 votes were cast in these primaries.

Candidates

Primaries and caucuses

California primary 
Type: Semi-Closed

In the California primary on February 5,  the Libertarian Party had a state-run primary held alongside those for the Republicans, Democrats, the Green Party, the American Independent Party and the Peace and Freedom Party.

Missouri primary 

In the Missouri primary on February 5, the Libertarian Party had a state-run primary held alongside the Republican and Democratic primaries.

2008 National Convention

See also
Presidential primaries
 2008 Democratic Party presidential primaries
 2008 Green Party presidential primaries
 2008 Republican Party presidential primaries

National Conventions
 2008 Constitution Party National Convention
 2008 Libertarian National Convention
 2008 Green National Convention
 2008 Democratic National Convention
 2008 Republican National Convention

References

Presidential primaries, 2008
2008 United States presidential primaries